The Corpus Christi Church is a former church on Avenida Juárez in the Historic center of Mexico City. It is the only remaining part of the Convent of Corpus Christi, founded in 1724 for Indian women and which was closed as part of the Reform Laws. The architect of the baroque structure was Pedro de Arrieta who also designed the Palace of the Inquisition and the Church of San Felipe Neri "La Profesa".

The church was damaged during the 1985 earthquake and it was restored.

See also
List of colonial churches in Mexico City
Catholic Church in Mexico

References

1724 establishments in New Spain
18th-century Roman Catholic church buildings in Mexico
18th century in Mexico City
Baroque church buildings in Mexico
Historic center of Mexico City
Roman Catholic churches completed in 1724
Roman Catholic churches in Mexico City
Spanish Colonial architecture in Mexico